Parda Hai Parda may refer to:

"Parda Hai Parda" (song), a song from the 1977 film Amar Akbar Anthony
Parda Hai Parda (film), a 1992 Hindi-language Indian film